Cassa Padana Banca di Credito Cooperativo S.C. is an Italian bank based in Leno, Lombardy region. The bank served the area around Brescia (Val Camonica and Val Trompia) and 8 other provinces of northern Italy.

In terms of branches, the bank is the fourth largest bank among the Federazione Italiana delle Banche di Credito Cooperativo - Casse Rurali ed Artigiane (Federcasse), behind Banca di Credito Cooperativo di Roma, Banca del Territorio Lombardo (71 branches in 2016) and Banca d'Alba. However, in terms of total assets (of 2014), the bank was behind BCC Roma, Banca d'Alba, Banca del Territorio Lombardo (pro forma data), Credito Cooperativo Ravennate e Imolese, Emilbanca, Banca Credito Cooperativo di Brescia, Banca di Credito Cooperativo di Carate Brianza, Banca Centropadana and ChiantiBanca. According to the same research by Ricerche e Studi, the bank was ranked 56th among all types of banks (despite some banks were omitted from the study). The bank was also the member of Federazione Lombarda delle Banche di Credito Cooperativo (6.23% stake).

History
Cassa Rurale ed Artigiana della Bassa Bresciana was formed in the 1970s by the merger of Cassa Rurale e Artigiana di Leno (found 1893), Cassa Rurale e Artigiana di Gambara (found 1891) and Cassa Rurale e Artigiana di Seniga e Pescarolo (found 1897). In 1993 the bank changed the name to Cassa Padana, after absorbing Cassa Rurale e Artigiana di Gussola. The bank absorbed "BCC Camuna" in 2010, "Banca Veneta 1896" and "BCC Valtrompia" in 2011.

In 2016, due to banking reform of BCC banks (Law N°49/201), the bank planned to demutualize itself by forming a subsidiary Cassa Padana S.p.A., leaving the co-operative society as a parent company only. However, in May 2017, the bank changed to join Cassa Centrale Banca banking group.

Equity interests
Cassa Padana owned minority interests in ICCREA Holding (1.35%), Banca Popolare Etica (0.23%), Investitionsbank Trentino Südtirol – Mediocredito Trentino Alto Adige (0.06%), Cassa Centrale Banca - Credito Cooperativo del Nord Est (0.00%) and Centrale Finanziaria del Nord Est (0.38%).

See also

 Banco di Brescia
 Banca Credito Cooperativo di Brescia
 Banca Popolare di Brescia
 Banca di Valle Camonica
 Banca del Territorio Lombardo
 Banca Valsabbina

References

External links
  

Former cooperative banks of Italy
Banks of Italy
Companies based in Lombardy
Banks established in 1893
1893 establishments in Italy
Province of Brescia